Sonicflood is the first album by the Christian rock band Sonicflood, released in 1999. The album features modern pop and rock renditions of praise and worship songs. Musically, the release was likened to a combination of Third Eye Blind and Radiohead, or PFR.

Track listing

Personnel 
Sonicflood
 Jeff Deyo – lead vocals, guitars, tambourine
 Jason Halbert – Hammond B3 organ, keyboards, programming, backing vocals
 Dwayne Larring – guitars, Ebow, noises, backing vocals
 Aaron Blanton – drums, percussion

Additional Musicians
 Bryan Lenox
 Mark Lee Townsend
 George Cocchini
 Barry Graul
 Micah Wilshire
 John McKinzie
 Otto Price
 Greg Herrington 
 Ric Robbins
 John Catchings – cello 
 Kristin Wilkinson – viola 
 David Davidson – violin, string arrangements 
 Lisa Kimmey-Bragg – vocals (6)
 Wilshire – vocals (7)
 Kevin Max – vocals (9)

Production 
 The Gotee Brothers – executive producers
 Sonicflood – producers, art direction
 Otto Price – additional production, additional programming, additional arrangements, engineer 
 Bryan Lenox – vocal producer, engineer, mixing, vocal recording 
 Jim McCastlin – engineer 
 Todd Robbins – additional engineer
 Eric Wolf – mastering 
 Mike McGlaflin – A&R direction
 Kerri McKeehan-Stuart – art direction, album design, underwater photography 
 Reid Waltz – graphic imaging 
 Tony Stone Images – cover photography 
 Ron Keith – underwater photography 
 Focus Right Management – management

Studios
 Recorded at The Border and The Playground (Franklin, Tennessee).
 Mixed at The Playground
 Mastered at Wolf Mastering (Nashville, Tennessee).

References

Sonicflood albums
1999 albums